Al-Jarajir is a Syrian village in the An-Nabek District of the Rif Dimashq Governorate. According to the Syria Central Bureau of Statistics (CBS), Al-Jarajir had a population of 4,022 in the 2004 census.

References

External links 

Populated places in An-Nabek District